Emin Murat Bilgel (born 1952) is a Turkish admiral who served as 24th Commander of the Turkish Naval Forces.

Biography
Admiral Bilgel was born in Istanbul in 1952. He graduated from the Naval High School in 1969 and the Naval Academy in 1973. After serving on board surface missile Frigates for two years, he volunteered for and joined the Submarine fleet as a Submarine Warfare Officer.

From 1975 to 1989, he assumed a variety of duties during his sea tour in the order of Weapons (Ballistic Missile) Officer, Navigation Head and Executive Officer on board Attack Submarines. He also returned to the Surface fleet briefly for a year to be the Executive Officer of an Anti-Submarine Frigate. He then served as the Commanding Officer of several attack Submarines, until 1994.

During this period, he also graduated from the Turkish Naval War College and Armed Forces College. Between 1994 and 1997, he commanded a squadron of 4 attack Submarines under the Southern Sea Area Command of the Navy. He additionally was enrolled in the Fast Patrol Boat Tactical Education Course in Germany and the Destroyer Group Head Officer Course in the United States. His shore tour included staff duties in the Turkish Naval Forces Command Headquarters and NATO AFSOUTH Headquarters in Italy.

After being promoted to rear admiral (lower half) in 1997, he served as the Chief of General Plans and Principles Directorate in the Ministry of National Defence, Chief of General Plans, Policy and CIMIC position of NAVSOUTH Headquarters in Italy and Commander of the Turkish Northern Task Group, combining a Submarine Squadron and a Surface Missile Frigate & Destroyer squadron.

Having been promoted to rear admiral (upper half) in 2002, he served as the Commander of Istanbul Strait Command, Commander of the Submarine Fleet and Chief of Staff of the Fleet Command.

Upon his promotion to vice admiral in 2005, he first assumed the Command Naval Training and Education from 2005 to 2007, and later served as the Chief of Staff, Turkish Naval Forces Command HQ from 2007 to 2009.

He was promoted to the rank of admiral in 2009, and commanded the Turkish Fleet from 2009 to 2011. He was retired in August 2013. 

Known to be a tough disciplinarian with a high focus on physical fitness of junior officers, Admiral Bilgel became the 24th Commander of the Turkish Naval Forces in August 2011, and the only one to rise to the very top from a Submariner background.

His decorations include Turkish Armed Forces Honour Medal, Turkish Armed Forces Distinguished Service Medal, NATO Medal (Kosovo and Former Yugoslavia), the Republic of Korea National Security Legion of Merit, Pakistan Nishan-ı Imtiyaz (Military) and Romanian Naval Forces Emblem of Honor.

Emin Bilgel is married with one child.

References

External links
http://www.dzkk.tsk.tr/

1952 births
Living people
Turkish admirals
Military personnel from Istanbul
Commanders of the Turkish Naval Forces